First-seeded Margareth Smith was the four-time defending champion, and successfully defended her title, defeating Lesley Turner 6–3, 6–2 in the final to win the women's singles tennis title at the 1964 Australian Championships.

Seeds
The seeded players are listed below. Margareth Smith is the champion; others show the round in which they were eliminated.

 Margaret Smith(champion)
 Lesley Turner (finalist)
 Jan Lehane (semifinals)
 Robyn Ebbern (semifinals)
 Judy Tegart (quarterfinals)
 Madonna Schacht (quarterfinals)
 Jill Blackman (quarterfinals)
 Rita Bentley (first round)

Draw

Key
 Q = Qualifier
 WC = Wild card
 LL = Lucky loser
 r = Retired

Finals

Earlier rounds

Section 1

Section 2

External links
 1964 Australian Championships on australianopen.com, the source for this draw

1964 in women's tennis
1964
1964 in Australian tennis
1964 in Australian women's sport